The Grammy Award for Best Latin Recording was presented from 1976 to 1983. Starting from 1984 the Latin field was expanded to Grammy Award for Best Latin Pop Album, Best Tropical Performance and Best Mexican/Mexican American Performance.

Years reflect the year in which the Grammy Awards were presented, for works released in the previous year.

1980s

1970s

See also

Grammy Award for Best Latin Pop Album

Latin Recording
Awards established in 1976
Awards disestablished in 1983